Vincent Raymond Stewart (born May 11, 1958) is a retired Jamaican American lieutenant general in the United States Marine Corps who most recently served as Deputy Commander at United States Cyber Command. He previously served as the 20th Director of the Defense Intelligence Agency (DIA). LtGen Stewart, who held that post from January 23, 2015 through October 3, 2017, was the first African American, first Jamaican American and first Marine to hold the position of Director of the DIA.

Early life and education
Stewart was born in Kingston, Jamaica. He attended Kingston College before immigrating to the United States in 1971 at age 13. He received his undergraduate degree in history in 1981 from Western Illinois University and was commissioned into the United States Marine Corps that same year.

Career
After earning his commission, he attended The Basic School (TBS) in Quantico, Virginia from 1981 to 1982 and was selected to become an Armor Officer. Upon graduation from this training, he was sent to the Armor Officer School in Fort Knox. He then received orders as a Platoon Leader to 1st Tank Battalion at Las Flores, 41 Area, Camp Pendleton, California. In 1984, he became the Executive Officer of Headquarters Company, 1st Tank Battalion.

He earned master's degrees in National Security and Strategic Studies from the Naval War College in 1995 and in National Resource Strategy from the Industrial College of the Armed Forces, National Defense University in 2002. On 23 January 2015, he left his position as the head of the Marine Force's Cyber Command to become the director of the US Defense Intelligence Agency, shortly before which he was promoted to the rank of lieutenant general.

LtGen Stewart retired from the U.S. Marine Corps at the Marine Barracks Washington on April 5, 2019.

Marine Corps assignments
 Platoon Leader, A Company, 1st Tank Battalion (1982–1983).
 Project Officer, Light Armored Vehicle, Anti-Tank, Twenty-Nine Palms, CA, (1983–1984).
 Executive Officer, Headquarters and Service Company, 1st Tank Battalion (1984–1985).
 Company Commander, I Company, Marine Support Battalion, Adak, Alaska, (1986–1988).
 Company Commander, Headquarters and Service Company, 2d Radio Battalion (1989–1990).
 Assistant Signals Intelligence Officer, 4th Marine Expeditionary Brigade, (1990–1991).
 Assistant Operations Officer, 2d Radio Battalion, Camp Lejeune, NC, (1991–1992).
 Company Commander, E Company, Marine Support Battalion, Misawa Japan (1992– 1994).
 Chief, Command, Control, Communications and Intelligence Officer, Special Purpose Marine Air-Ground Task Force, Experimental, Quantico, VA, (1996–1999).
 Commanding Officer, 1st Intelligence Battalion, Camp Pendleton, CA, (1999–2001).
 Deputy G-2, Marine Forces Central Command (2002).
 Assistant Chief of Staff, Intelligence, Marine Corps Forces Command, Norfolk, VA, (2005–2006).
 Commanding Officer, Headquarters Battalion, 2d Marine Division, Camp Lejeune, NC, (2006–2008).
 Assistant Chief of Staff, Intelligence, 2nd Marine Expeditionary Force, Camp Lejeune, NC, (2008–2009).
 Director of Intelligence, Marine Corps Intelligence, HQMC, Washington, DC, (2009–2013).
 Commanding General, U.S. Marine Corps Forces Cyberspace, Fort Meade, MD, (2013-2015)

Department of Defense assignments
 Deputy Director, Intelligence Policy, Office of the Assistant Secretary of Defense, C3I (2001–2002).
 Senior Intelligence Planner, Office of the Under Secretary of Defense for Intelligence (2002–2005)
 Commander, Joint Functional Component Command for Intelligence, Surveillance and Reconnaissance, (2015-2017).
 Director, Defense Intelligence Agency, (2015–2017).
 Deputy Commander, United States Cyber Command, (2017-2019).

Personal life
Stewart is married with five children.

Awards and decorations
Lieutenant General Stewart's decorations and medals include:

References

External links

1958 births
Directors of the Defense Intelligence Agency
Dwight D. Eisenhower School for National Security and Resource Strategy alumni
Jamaican emigrants to the United States
Living people
Naval War College alumni
People from Kingston, Jamaica
Recipients of the Defense Superior Service Medal
Recipients of the Legion of Merit
United States Marine Corps generals
Western Illinois University alumni